The title of Professor of Jurisprudence may refer to one of the following academic positions:

 Professor of Jurisprudence (Glasgow), founded at the University of Glasgow in 1952
 Professor of Jurisprudence (University of Oxford) (formerly known as the "Corpus Professor of Jurisprudence"), founded in 1869
 Dorothea S. Clarke Professor of Feminist Jurisprudence at Cornell Law School